Sweet Return is a studio album by jazz trumpeter Freddie Hubbard recorded in June 1983 and released on the Atlantic Records label.

Reception
The AllMusic review by Scott Yanow calls the album "One of Freddie Hubbard's best albums since the early '70's". Similarly, writing shortly after the album's release, both Chuck Berg of the Lawrence Journal-World and Peter Hadekel of the Montreal Gazette commended Hubbard's return to form, with Berg citing the trumpeter's "desire to play 'real' music sans the fads, frills and fancy stuff of pseudo-funk."

Track listing
 "Sweet Return" (Joan Cartwright) - 9:24  
 "Misty" (Johnny Burke, Erroll Garner) - 5:58  
 "Whistling Away the Dark" (Henry Mancini, Johnny Mercer) - 5:06  
 "Calypso Fred" (Hubbard)  4:13  
 "Heidi-B" (Joanne Brackeen) - 12:54  
 "The Night has a Thousand Eyes" (Buddy Bernier, Jerry Brainin) - 10:21

Personnel
Freddie Hubbard - trumpet
Joanne Brackeen - piano
Lew Tabackin - tenor saxophone, flute
Eddie Gómez - bass
Roy Haynes - drums

References

1983 albums
Freddie Hubbard albums
Atlantic Records albums